Roger Manners (c. 1575 – 1632) was an English politician.

He was a Member (MP) of the Parliament of England for East Retford in 1601.

His memorial is in St Lawrence's Church, Whitwell.

References

1570s births
1632 deaths
English MPs 1601